"Oh, Arkansas" by Terry Rose and Gary Klaff is one of the official state songs of Arkansas. It was written in 1986 for the state's 150th-anniversary celebration and was named an official "state song" by the Arkansas General Assembly in 1987.

Other official Arkansas state songs are "Arkansas", state anthem (state song before 1949 and from 1963 to 1987); "Arkansas (You Run Deep In Me)", also written for the state's 150th birthday in 1986, and likewise designated "state song" in 1987; and "The Arkansas Traveler", state historical song (state song from 1949 to 1963).

External links
Lyrics & download of "Oh, Arkansas", from Arkansas Secretary of State's website
Arkansas Code (Section 1-4-116, State songs and anthem)

Arkansas
Symbols of Arkansas
Music of Arkansas
1986 songs
Songs about Arkansas